, provisional designation , is a trans-Neptunian object in the scattered disc located in the outermost region of the Solar System, approximately  in diameter. It was discovered on 11 July 2010 by the Pan-STARRS-1 survey at the Haleakala Observatory, Hawaii, in the United States.

Classification and orbit 

 has an observation arc of 1774 days, and there are currently no known precovery images to help refine its orbit. It is currently 53.7 AU from the Sun. Based on JPL's best-fit solution for the orbit, it reached aphelion around 1829. It is estimated to come to perihelion around 2079. Although the discovery is credited to Pan-STARRS, the object was first announced in a Minor Planet Electronic Circular by American astronomers David Rabinowitz, Megan Schwamb and Suzanne Tourtellotte observing from La Silla Observatory on 9 September 2010.

Numbering and naming 

This minor planet was numbered by the Minor Planet Center on 25 September 2018. As of 2018, it has not been named.

Physical characteristics 

Assuming a generic trans-Neptunian albedo of 0.09, it is about 580 kilometers in diameter. However, since the true albedo is unknown and it has an absolute magnitude of 4.4, it could easily be from about 350 to 780 km in diameter (for typical albedos of 0.05 to 0.25). Michael Brown estimates a similar diameter of 561 kilometers, also using a geometric albedo of 0.09 and a fainter 4.6 absolute magnitude.

References

External links 
 Discovery Circumstances: Numbered Minor Planets (520001)-(525000) – Minor Planet Center
 
 

523639
523639
523639
20100711